Sweet 15 is a 1990 American made-for-television family drama film directed by Victoria Hochberg and starring Karla Montana, Panchito Gómez, Jerry Stiller, and Tony Plana. The plot concerns a fourteen-year-old girl whose dreams of having a perfect quinceanera are suddenly halted when she realizes that her family is residing in the United States illegally. At the same time, she is smitten by Ramon, a cousin of her friend, and wants him to dance with her at her party.

A WonderWorks film, it is commonly shown in Spanish classes all over the country to teach about Hispanic culture.

Plot
Marta de la Cruz is the daughter of two hardworking Mexican immigrants. She and her two siblings were born in the United States and are living in Los Angeles. They are a working-class family, and their hardworking father, Samuel, is the operations manager of a steel mill that makes chain link fences, where he uses the fake name "Arturo Montoya". He has been working hard for much of his life, and the work finally paid off when they became legal citizens. They also have a close relationship with their next-door neighbor Jorge, who is struggling to find work because he has no papers. Marta is seen as spoiled, immature, and somewhat naive, but she wants to have an amazing quinceanera, as her friends are not having one. Her parents tell her that she may have to postpone it, because of financial problems, when in reality, they are not legal citizens, and they need to save money in case Samuel's boss, Mr. Waterman finds out and he is left jobless. Marta does not understand the situation and is very angry and upset. Her jealousy only increases when she is forced to get a job in their church to volunteer in the community.

She continues to plan, however, determined to have her "quince". Also, her friends are busy hitting on her friend Gabi's, distant cousin Ramón from New York City who just arrived in California. They are pressuring Marta to have him as her escort at her quince, but she is too shy, and Ramón is struggling with his inability to read or write. It must also be noted that Ramón appears to be much older than her.

Samuel knows that he has earned his citizenship, as he has worked hard and respected the laws and customs of America for over a decade, but as he has no papers, he cannot be. While working at the church one day, Marta discovers that Samuel is undocumented. Understandably, she becomes upset, and eventually confronts her father. The same day that Maria discovered her fathers status, despite Samuel's warnings, Jorge gets a job at a warehouse that is known for deporting illegal employees on pay day.

Sadly, he gets caught by the police, and is likely deported (the capture is shown; the deporting is not).

Despite her father's wishes for her to not date Ramón, she goes behind his back and enlists him for help in getting all of Samuel's previous employer's signatures, so he can get his papers. Meanwhile, Jorge is deported to Mexico when he fails to present his papers. Also, at Samuel's plant, more and more employees are being fired or deported, and Samuel fears he may be next, so he is hard at work trying to find a second job, one that does not require papers. Meanwhile, Marta gets all but one signature, and goes to an auto salvage yard for the last one, but the manager is rude and stubbornly refuses to sign the papers. Marta is persistent, and the manager has a change of heart and manages to sign the papers. Also, Ramón learns how to read and surprises Marta with it.

She presents her father with his signatures, and he sends them in for their papers. Soon after, he is given his temporary papers to show at his job, as it will be a while before their permanent papers arrive. Samuel thanks his daughter and they embrace. However, Marta is soon told that they found that she had been tampering with the files and she has to go inside. Expecting the worst, she discovers a surprise quince. During the quinceanera, Ramón shows Marta that he had learned to write.

Cast
 Karla Montana as Marta de la Cruz
 Panchito Gómez as Ramón
 Jerry Stiller as Mr. Waterman
 Tony Plana as Samuel Dela Cruz
 Robert Covarrubias as Jorge
 Laura P. Vega as Gabrielle 'Gaby' Corea
 Giselle Anthony as Jackie

Reception
The film received positive reviews because of its realistic and non-biased depiction on the touchy subject of illegal immigration, but negative ones due to the acting. It has become somewhat of a hidden classic and is commonly shown in Spanish classes because of its clean, family-friendly depiction of Mexican culture.

References

External links
 

1990 films
1990 television films
Hispanic and Latino American drama films
Films about Mexican Americans
1990s English-language films
1990s American films